Marie Conmee (1933–1994) was an Irish film and stage actor and gay activist.

With her partner Mary Brady she facilitated a monthly group for lesbians to meet in a pub in Dublin in the 1980s, at a time when such opportunities were scarce.

Her acting career spanned almost 40 years, and she appeared in films, including This Other Eden (1959), Educating Rita (1983), and My Left Foot (1989) and Circle of Friends (1995). She appeared in plays including the first productions of Hugh Leonard's Madigan's Lock (1958), Adrian Vale and Chloe Gibson's Inquiry at Lisieux (1963) and  Peter Sheridan's Down all the Days (1982).

She was born in Sligo and died in Dublin. A writer in the Irish Independent in 2004 described her as having been "massively built".

References

External links

1933 births
1994 deaths
Irish film actresses
Irish stage actresses
20th-century Irish actresses
People from Sligo (town)
Irish lesbian actresses
20th-century Irish LGBT people